Mack Heller (1910 – October 18, 1940) was an American Negro league first baseman in the 1930s.

Heller played for the Monroe Monarchs in 1932. He died in Caddo Parish, Louisiana in 1940 at age 29 or 30.

References

External links
 and Seamheads

1910 births
1940 deaths
Date of birth missing
Place of birth missing
Monroe Monarchs players
Baseball first basemen
20th-century African-American sportspeople